Gordon Meade (born 1957) is a poet.

Biography
Gordon Meade studied English at the University of Dundee and Newcastle University.  In 1993 he was appointed a creative writing fellow at Duncan of Jordanstone College of Art and Design in Dundee.  He was also writer in residence for Dundee
District Libraries.

Since 2000 he has led creative writing workshops for adults and vulnerable young children in drop-in centres and hospitals, as well as at universities in Germany, Belgium and Luxembourg.  From 2008-2010 and 2011-2012 he was one of the Royal Literary Fund writing fellows at the University of Dundee.

Meade's latest work, Les Animots: A Human Bestiary, a book-length series of illustrated poems, was published in 2015.

Works
The Singing Seals (Chapman Publishing, 1991) 
The Scrimshaw Sailor (Chapman Publishing, 1996) 
A Man at Sea (Diehard Press, 2003) 
The Cleaner Fish (Arrowhead Press, 2006) 
The Private Zoo (Arrowhead Press, 2008) 
The Familiar (Arrowhead Press, 2011) 
Sounds of the Real World (Cultured Llama Publishing, 2013) 
Les Animots: A Human Bestiary (Cultured Llama Publishing, 2015) 
The Year of the Crab (Cultured Llama Publishing, 2017) 
Zoospeak: Poems and Photography (Enthusiastic Press, 2020)

References

External links
 – Interview with Cultured Llama Publishing 2014

1957 births
Living people
People educated at Strathallan School
Alumni of the University of Dundee
Alumni of Newcastle University
Scottish poets
People from Perthshire